Nurul Akmal (born 12 February 1993) is an Indonesian weightlifter. She won the silver medal in the women's +90kg event at the 2017 Islamic Solidarity Games held in Baku, Azerbaijan. She also represented Indonesia at the 2020 Summer Olympics in Tokyo, Japan.

Career 

In 2017, she finished in 6th place in the women's +90kg event at the Summer Universiade held in Taipei, Taiwan. The following year, she represented Indonesia at the 2018 Asian Games held in Jakarta, Indonesia in the women's +75kg event where she finished in 6th place. She also competed in the women's +87 kg event at the 2018 World Weightlifting Championships held in Ashgabat, Turkmenistan.

In 2019, she competed in the women's +87 kg at the World Weightlifting Championships held in Pattaya, Thailand. In that same year, she won the bronze medal in the women's +87kg event at the 6th International Qatar Cup held in Doha, Qatar. In April 2021, she competed at the 2020 Asian Weightlifting Championships held in Tashkent, Uzbekistan.

She represented Indonesia at the 2020 Summer Olympics in Tokyo, Japan. She finished in 5th place in the women's +87 kg event. She was also one of the flagbearers for Indonesia during the 2020 Summer Olympics Parade of Nations as part of the opening ceremony on 23 July 2021.

She won the bronze medal in the women's +87kg event at the 2021 Islamic Solidarity Games held in Konya, Turkey. She won the silver medal in her event at the 2022 Asian Weightlifting Championships held in Manama, Bahrain.

Awards and nominations

Achievements

References

External links 
 

Living people
1993 births
People from Banda Aceh
Indonesian female weightlifters
Weightlifters at the 2018 Asian Games
Asian Games competitors for Indonesia
Islamic Solidarity Games medalists in weightlifting
Islamic Solidarity Games competitors for Indonesia
Competitors at the 2017 Summer Universiade
Weightlifters at the 2020 Summer Olympics
Olympic weightlifters of Indonesia
Southeast Asian Games medalists in weightlifting
Southeast Asian Games silver medalists for Indonesia
Competitors at the 2021 Southeast Asian Games
21st-century Indonesian women